is a professional wrestling video game series originating from Japan, started in 1989 by Human Entertainment, and currently developed and owned by Spike Chunsoft. The series is distinguished by its grappling system, which is primarily based on timed button presses and strategy. Another signature feature of the series is its Edit mode, a character creation feature with many options to customize appearances, wrestling moves and character artificial intelligence behavior.

Unlike many other pro wrestling games, most Fire Pro games are not licensed by any major professional wrestling promotion, but feature likenesses of real-life wrestlers under different names. Games in the series generally utilize 2-D sprite-based graphics, with some later games incorporating 3D graphical elements. Most of the titles in the Fire Pro Wrestling series have originally been released in Japan, although some of the games have seen releases in North America and worldwide.

Series features
Unlike many other pro wrestling games, most games in the Fire Pro Wrestling series are not licensed by any major professional wrestling promotion, but feature likenesses of real-life wrestlers under different names. Games in the series generally utilize 2-D sprite-based graphics, with some later games incorporating 3-D graphical elements. The spin-off series King of Colosseum features polygonal 3-D graphics.

The Fire Pro Wrestling series of games distinguish themselves from other wrestling games by combining several unique features. One feature is the focus on a timing-based grappling control system. The grappling control system encourages the use of complex strategy, built on working up to using increasingly powerful moves on your opponent. The timing-based system also stands in contrast to the button-mashing tactics with which most 2-D wrestling gamers and fighting gamers are familiar.

Another feature of Fire Pro Wrestling games is the inclusion of a large roster of playable wrestlers and fighters from different promotions located around the world. The wrestlers and promotions are renamed from their real-life counterparts to avoid copyright, and represent many different styles of professional wrestling: North American WWE style sports-entertainment, Mexican lucha-libre, various styles of Japanese puroresu: athletic junior-heavyweight style, realistic strong-style, women's joshi wrestling, and violent hardcore wrestling, as well as different styles of mixed martial arts.

A variety of match types are available in the Fire Pro Wrestling series of games, with flexible settings for the rules within each match. This complements the variety of wrestlers available as playable characters. Different match types include conventional singles and tag-team wrestling matches, extreme hardcore matches such as the "Landmine Death Match" or "Electric Barbed Wire Cage Match", and various types of mixed-martial-arts matches.

Another distinguishing feature of the Fire Pro Wrestling series of games, particularly the later games in the series, is the inclusion of an extensive and highly detailed wrestler creation and edit mode. The edit mode of Fire Pro Wrestling games allows players to build game characters with a high level of attention to detail. Appearance characteristics, such as clothing and ring attire, and physical build, head and facial features, can be customized for a created wrestler. A detailed set of wrestling and fighting moves, drawn from the large pool of moves built into each game, can also be assigned to a created wrestler. The edit mode of Fire Pro Wrestling games also allows players to make detailed changes to the CPU logic of an edited wrestler, making it possible for a skilled creator to create a wrestler that behaves very much like his real-life counterpart, even when controlled by the computer.

Later titles in the series allowed for customization of other aspects of professional wrestling, including changing the design of the ring mat and apron, creating customized championship belts, and creation and editing of referees. The detailed character creation and edit mode of the Fire Pro Wrestling games became an influential feature that was eventually added to other wrestling and sports games.

The combination of features included in Fire Pro Wrestling games allows players to create "dream matchups" between wrestlers from different promotions, or different eras in the history of professional wrestling, as well as matches between real-life wrestlers and fighters, fictional characters and non-wrestling celebrities.

Overview

Beginning with the first title in the series from Human Entertainment, Fire Pro Wrestling Combination Tag for PC Engine in 1989, the Fire Pro Wrestling series eventually produced editions of games for many systems, notably the Super Famicom, Sega Saturn, Game Boy Advance, Dreamcast and the PlayStation 2. Human also released a wrestling game outside the Fire Pro Wrestling series in 1989 for Game Boy.  Titled Pro Wrestling in its native Japan, it was released internationally as HAL Wrestling. Most of the titles in the Fire Pro Wrestling series have been released exclusively in Japan, although some of the games have seen releases in North America.

The series became popular in Japan, but did not see an official international release until after Spike took over the franchise in 2000. Early games in the Fire Pro Wrestling series were popular outside Japan with import gamers, and at least one game, Super Fire Pro Wrestling X Premium for Super Famicom, received an unofficial fan translation through video game console emulators. Fire Pro Wrestling A for the Game Boy Advance was released internationally as Fire Pro Wrestling in 2001, and was one of the titles initially available when the Game Boy Advance was launched in Japan and North America. Four editions of the game have received official English translations: Fire Pro Wrestling (2001) and Fire Pro Wrestling 2 (2002) for the GBA, Fire Pro Wrestling Returns for PS2 (2007), and Fire Pro Wrestling World for the Steam PC platform and PS4 (2017/2018) .

At the 2010 Tokyo Game Show, it was announced that a 3-D avatar-based version of Fire Pro Wrestling would be released for the Xbox 360 in 2011. It was not released until September 21, 2012. In hopes of appealing to a more casual audience, the developers decided on debuting a new gameplay engine that would use a button-mashing minigame system to perform moves, and not using the well-reviewed timing elements from previous versions of the game.

On February 24, 2017, Spike Chunsoft debuted a website featuring a teaser video of the series making a possible return. Less than a week later, on March 3, Fire Pro Wrestling World was officially announced, returning the series to its roots, in terms of graphical presentation and gameplay mechanics. Also, the new game would be the first in the series to incorporate online multiplayer gameplay on the PC via Steam and the PlayStation 4 console. Fire Pro Wrestling World was released to Early Access on Steam for the PC platform on July 10, 2017, and left Early Access, to a full release, on December 18, 2017.

On June 30, 2018, Spike Chunsoft debuted a commercial featuring wrestlers Kenny Omega and Kota Ibushi, announcing that the game would be released in North America for PS4 on August 28, 2018. Spike Chunsoft also announced that they had come to terms on official licensing with New Japan Pro-Wrestling, making Fire Pro Wrestling World the first title in the series to be licensed by the "King of Sports", and the first game to be licensed by the wrestling organization in over eleven years.

Titles

Human Entertainment

Spike / Spike Chunsoft

Spin-offs

See also
List of licensed wrestling video games
List of fighting games

References

External links

 
Human Entertainment games
Kadokawa Dwango franchises
Professional wrestling games
Video game franchises introduced in 1989
Video games developed in Japan